Princess Charles may refer to:

Diana, Princess of Wales (1961–1997), first wife of King Charles III
Camilla, Queen Consort (born 1947), second and current wife of King Charles III

See also 
Princess of Wales